Corioni is a surname of Italian origin. Notable people with the surname include:

 Claudio Corioni (born 1982), Italian  road bicycle racer
 Luigi Corioni (1937–2016), Italian businessman

Italian-language surnames